Vyvan Pham (born November 16, 1978) is an American voice actress, perhaps best known for her role as "Julie Yamamoto" on Ben 10: Alien Force, and Ben 10: Ultimate Alien. She also voiced Outsider member "Katana" in Batman: The Brave and the Bold.

She has also provided voices for a few video games including X-Men: The Official Game, Spider-Man 3, and others.

Filmography

Film

Television

Video games

External links

Vyvan Pham at Voice Chasers

1978 births
Living people
American voice actresses
American television actresses
American video game actresses
American people of Vietnamese descent
Actresses of Vietnamese descent
21st-century American women